The 1915 Mississippi Normal Normalites football team was an American football team that represented Mississippi Normal College (now known as the University of Southern Mississippi) as an independent during the 1915 college football season. In their second year under head coach A. B. Dille, the team compiled a 4–3 record.

Schedule

References

Mississippi Normal
Southern Miss Golden Eagles football seasons
Mississippi Normal Normalites football